The Netherlands national badminton team represents the Netherlands in international badminton team competitions. It is controlled by Badminton Nederland. The Dutch women's team had enjoyed success in the 2000s as the team were runners-up at the 2006 Uber Cup and were champions at the 2006 European Women's Team Badminton Championships when they beat England.

The men's team were runners-up at the 2020 European Men's Team Badminton Championships after losing 3-0 to Denmark. They also participated in the Thomas Cup but never got past the group stage.

Participation in BWF competitions

Thomas Cup 

Uber Cup 

Sudirman Cup

Participation in European Team Badminton Championships

Men's Team

Women's Team

Mixed Team

Participation in Helvetia Cup

Participation in European Junior Team Badminton Championships
Mixed Team

Current squad 
The following players were selected to represent the Netherlands at the 2020 European Men's and Women's Team Badminton Championships.

Male players
Mark Caljouw
Joran Kweekel
Finn Achthoven
Jelle Maas
Robin Tabeling
Jacco Arends
Ruben Jille
Ties van der Lecq
Wessel van der Aar
Nick Fransman

Female players
Soraya de Visch Eijbergen
Jaymie Laurens
Selena Piek
Cheryl Seinen
Debora Jille
Alyssa Tirtosentono
Imke van der Aar
Gayle Mahulette
Meike Versteeg
Nadia Choukri

References

Badminton
National badminton teams
Badminton in the Netherlands